Mokwa is a Local Government Area in Niger State, Nigeria. Its headquarters are in the town of Mokwa on the A1 highway in the west of the area.

Mokwa is a town in Niger state with an estimated population of 244,937 (2006).
The long southern border of the LGA is formed by the Niger River from Lake Jebba in the west beyond the confluence of the Kaduna River in the east. Kwara State and Kogi State are across the Niger from the LGA. The A1 highway crosses the Niger at Gana to Jebba in Kwara State.

Mokwa is a Nupe kingdom led by the Ndalile (presently Lile Shaba Aliyu) and consisting of sub-districts such as Muwo, Bokani, Kudu, Kpaki, Jebba, Rabba, Ja'agi and others. The leadership style of Mokwa town is emirship, and the head of the town is addressed as Ndalile.

It has an area of 4,338 km and a population of 244,937 at the 2006 census.

The postal code of the area is 912.

References

Local Government Areas in Niger State